The Commandant's Letter of Commendation Ribbon is a personal military award of the United States Coast Guard.  The award was established in March 1979 by Admiral John B. Hayes.

Criteria
The Commandant's Letter of Commendation Ribbon is awarded to any member of the Coast Guard who receives a Letter of Commendation from the Commandant of the United States Coast Guard.  The decoration is retroactive to August 12, 1921 which was when the Commandant's Commendation Letter was first issued by Admiral William E. Reynolds.

Additional awards of the Commandant's Letter of Commendation Ribbon are denoted by 5/16 inch stars. The Commandant's Letter of Commendation Ribbon with the Operational Distinguishing Device may be authorized for operational and field condition achievements. Considering Coast Guard awards and decorations only, the Commandant's Letter of Commendation Ribbon is below the Coast Guard Achievement Medal in order of precedence.

See also
 Awards and decorations of the United States military

References

Citations

Sources

Awards and decorations of the United States Coast Guard
Awards established in 1979
US Coast Guard ribbon symbolism